Ilta Savoyssa (in English: Evening at Savoy) is the sixth album and the first live album by Finnish pop rock singer-songwriter Maija Vilkkumaa. Released by Warner Music in Finland on 13 June 2007, the tracks of the album were recorded on live performances of her debut concert tour Totuutta ja tehtävää. Ilta Savoyssa peaked at number 12 on its debut week on the Finnish Albums Chart and charted for eight weeks.

Track listing
Digital download

Charts

References

2007 live albums
Maija Vilkkumaa albums
Finnish-language albums